Irmgard of Chiemsee (also Irmengard;  – 16 July 866), a member of the Carolingian dynasty, was the second daughter of King Louis the German and his wife Hemma. She was the first abbess of Frauenwörth abbey from 857 until her death.

Life
Born at King Louis' court in Regensburg, Bavaria, young Irmgard, like her sisters, was destined for a monastic life. She was raised at the Benedictine abbey of Buchau in Swabia, whose estates she later received from the hands of her father. She was known for her comprehensive education

About 850 Louis appointed Irmgard abbess of Frauenwörth, which had been founded by the last Agilolfing duke Tassilo III of Bavaria in 782 and held the status of an Imperial abbey since 788. During her leadership the decayed premises were restored and the former chapter for noble ladies developed into a Benedictine convent.

Since she was of Imperial descent, the incumbent abbess of Frauenwörth had the right to wear a thin golden hoop, resembling a little crown.

Veneration
Irmgard was already venerated in the early 11th century, when abbot Gerhard had her head reliquary translated to Seeon Abbey in 1004. However, she was beatified only on 17 July 1929 by Pope Pius XI, on initiative of Cardinal Faulhaber. Her relics were re-unified during a festive ceremony in 2003.

Irmengard's feast is 16 July. In Frauenchiemsee, Irmengardstag is celebrated the Sunday nearest to 16 July. In paintings Irmgard is portrayed in a Benedictine habit either crowned with Bible and abbot's staff or with heart in her hand.

Ancestry

Notes

References

830s births
866 deaths
Year of birth uncertain
German beatified people
Benedictine nuns
Women of medieval Germany
Carolingian dynasty
Women from the Carolingian Empire
Christian saints
Consecrated virgins